Park Cheong-sam (born 9 November 1946) is a South Korean judoka. He competed in the men's lightweight event at the 1964 Summer Olympics.

References

1946 births
Living people
South Korean male judoka
Olympic judoka of South Korea
Judoka at the 1964 Summer Olympics
Place of birth missing (living people)
Universiade silver medalists for South Korea
Universiade medalists in judo
Medalists at the 1967 Summer Universiade
20th-century South Korean people